Brindas is a commune of the Rhône department in eastern France.

Geography 
It lies about 15 km (9,5 mi) South-West of Lyon, but not included in the Metropolis of Lyon.

History 
Brindas is often regarded as the second home of Guignol, a French puppet show from Lyon.  The name of the village was often quoted in parts of Guignol plays as several Guignol entertainers used to spend holiday time in this village.  Pierre Neichthauser, mayor of Brindas from 1929 until 1940, was also the puppeteer for the character Gnafron in his Guignol Mourguet theatre.

A Guignol museum-theater ("Musée-théâtre Guignol") was opened in Brindas in 2008 (year of Guignol's bicentenary).

Population

See also
Communes of the Rhône department

References

External links

 Official website
 Musée-théâtre website
 Brindas & Guignol website (page in english)

Communes of Rhône (department)